"Did I Stutter?" is the sixteenth episode of the fourth season of the American comedy television series The Office, and the show's sixty-ninth episode overall. Written by Brent Forrester and Justin Spitzer, and directed by Randall Einhorn, the episode first aired in the United States on May 1, 2008 on NBC.

The series depicts the everyday lives of office employees in the Scranton, Pennsylvania branch of the fictional Dunder Mifflin Paper Company. In this episode, Michael Scott (Steve Carell) is shocked when Stanley Hudson (Leslie David Baker) yells at him, and is unsure how to handle the situation. Michael tries to assert his power over Stanley, by pretending to fire him, but that only makes matters worse. The two eventually end up alone in the office. Meanwhile, Jim Halpert (John Krasinski) receives a warning about his job performance, Pam Beesly (Jenna Fischer) is forced to wear her glasses, and Dwight Schrute (Rainn Wilson) buys Andy Bernard's (Ed Helms) car.

Originally, episode writers Justin Spitzer and Brent Forrester were supposed to write two separate episodes. However, the effects of the 2007–2008 Writers Guild of America strike forced the two to share an episode. "Did I Stutter?" contained several pop culture references. It received largely positive reviews from critics, who praised the interaction between Carell and Baker. The episode earned a Nielsen rating of 3.9 in the 18–49 demographic, being viewed by 7.76 million viewers.

Plot
Michael Scott (Steve Carell) calls an emergency meeting asking everyone to come up with an idea to "reinvigorate" the office. Michael asks Stanley Hudson (Leslie David Baker) for ideas, but Stanley is preoccupied with a crossword puzzle and refuses to participate. Michael keeps asking him, and Stanley snaps, "Did I stutter?" in a loud, threatening tone, after which Michael ends the meeting. Toby Flenderson (Paul Lieberstein) encourages Michael to take disciplinary action against Stanley, and Michael, initially resistant, pretends to fire him to teach him a lesson. Stanley responds by threatening to sue him and tell corporate of Michael's antics. When Michael tells Stanley that the firing was actually an attempt at teaching him a lesson, Stanley goes on a rant, yelling and insulting Michael. Michael barks at him to stop it, and tells everyone to leave the office, making everyone think he is about to berate Stanley. The camera crew sneak back in to film the exchange, where Michael tearfully (much to Stanley's annoyance) asks Stanley why he picks on him. Stanley states that he simply does not respect him, and when Michael suggests that Stanley does not know him very well he replies "Michael, I've known you for a very long time. And the more I've gotten to know you, the less I've come to respect you." Michael then takes a professional tone with Stanley, and says that, while he accepts that Stanley does not respect him, he cannot take such a disrespectful tone with him, because he is his boss. Stanley responds by saying, "Fair enough," and the two shake hands.

Pam Beesly (Jenna Fischer), after spending the night at "a friend's" (Jim's) house, forgot her contact lens solution, so she must wear her glasses. She finds it difficult to handle Michael's criticism and Kevin's sexual advances, and spends the rest of the day without her glasses, reducing her productivity. Ryan Howard (B. J. Novak) comes to Dunder Mifflin's Scranton branch. After a talk with Toby, Ryan tells Jim Halpert (John Krasinski) that he is giving him an official warning about his job performance. Ryan denies that his action is motivated by Jim's previous complaints to David Wallace, saying he thrives on constructive criticism (while Toby's comments to the documentary crew indicate he is not upset about the warning, owing to his envy of Jim's relationship with Pam).

Andy Bernard (Ed Helms) is selling his 2001 Nissan Xterra for $8,700. Dwight Schrute (Rainn Wilson) pressures him into selling it for $1,500 less than the asking price, because according to Dwight, "[the] car is crap". Dwight assures Andy that he will only use it as a wagon, dragged by a mule on Dwight's beet farm. Andy sells it to Dwight, who, in a passive-aggressive method of getting back at him for dating Angela Martin (Angela Kinsey), washes it and posts a sign asking for $9,995 for the vehicle, which upsets Andy when he finds Dwight's advertisement posted on the cabinet in the office kitchen. Dwight declares that it is already on eBay, where he claims it is the subject of a three-way bidding war.

Production
The episode was the fourth episode of the series directed by Randall Einhorn. Einhorn had previously directed the third season episodes "Initiation", "Ben Franklin" and "Product Recall", as well as the ten summer webisodes "The Accountants". It was Einhorn's idea to show the cameramen sneaking back into the office after Michael told everyone to leave. This aspect of the episode was praised by fans as well as the cast and crew. Brent Forrester, the co-writer of the episode, noted that Einhorn's "energy doubled when shooting that" scene.

"Did I Stutter?" was written by Justin Spitzer and Brent Forrester. Although the two writers initially planned to write separate episodes, the 2007–2008 Writers Guild of America strike forced the two to share an episode. Forrester and Spitzer initially disagreed about what the episode's title should be. Forrester wanted to name it "Did I Stutter?"—a phrase popularized by Judd Nelson's character Bender in the 1985 film The Breakfast Club—while Spitzer wanted a name like "The Reprimand" or "Insubordination". Gene Stupnitsky and Lee Eisenberg wrote the scenes featuring Andy and Angela playing Mad Libs. Justin Spitzer called the sequence "amazing".

In the opening scene in which Michael puts his face in cement, the wet cement that was used was actually putty. The crew was planning to do only one take of Steve Carell putting his face in the putty, so he was instructed to hold his breath as long as he possibly could. But the crew forgot to tell the other actors about that, so during the filming of the scene, the actors thought he was actually stuck and there was a rush to pull him out. Kim M. Ferry, owner of the Nissan Xterra featured in the episode, is the show's Department Head Hairstylist. After it was used on the show, she decided to sell it on eBay. The listing was first put up on eBay on May 1, 2008, the night the episode aired.

The Season Four DVD contains a number of deleted scenes from this episode. Notable cut scenes include Michael trying to convince Jim, Pam, and Kelly, while they are in the break room having lunch that Stanley talks badly about everyone behind their backs, Michael making Pam stand up during the meeting and confessing that she wears glasses, Jim talking to Toby about the warning (in contrast to how Toby seems happy that Jim is getting in trouble during the broadcast episode, here the HR head makes it clear that Jim's sales performance is good and that Ryan is the sole person who is not happy with his work), and Ryan saying that "going after Jim" is "a risky move", since CFO David Wallace likes Jim.

Cultural references
Andy and Angela play Mad Libs, a phrasal template word game where one player prompts another for a list of words to substitute for blanks in a story, usually with funny results. Ryan chides Jim for being a fan of the Philadelphia Eagles, a professional American football team. While Daryl is telling Michael how gang members deal with problems, he mentions that he was a member of the Newsies (the name of a 1992 musical drama) and The Warriors (the gang in the 1979 cult action film of the same name). Near the end of the episode, Michael does a succession of comedian impressions. These include badly performed spoofs of Rodney Dangerfield, Henny Youngman, Jeff Foxworthy, Sacha Baron Cohen as Borat Sagdiyev, and Jerry Seinfeld.

Reception
"Did I Stutter?" originally aired on NBC in the United States on May 1, 2008. The episode received 3.9/10 in the ages 18–49 demographic in the Nielsen ratings. This means that 3.9 percent of all households with an 18- to 49-year-old living in it watched the episode, and ten percent had their televisions tuned to the channel at any point. The episode was watched by 7.67 million viewers.

The episode was highly acclaimed by critics, with many praising the performance from Leslie David Baker. Nathan Rabin of The A.V. Club gave the episode an "A", citing the dynamic between Michael and Stanley as its main strengths. He was also complimentary towards the cold opening and the realistic way in which Michael and Stanley's confrontation was filmed. Ultimately, Rabin concluded that the interaction between Carell and Baker was reason to "love the Stanley/Michael dynamic" and that the episode "was all about rage and conflict". M. Giant of Television Without Pity awarded the episode an "A−".

Rick Porter of Zap2It said that even though the episode "was long on uncomfortable and even disturbing behavior" and "only out-and-out funny in a few spots" he found himself "respecting it a fair amount at the end". BuddyTV Senior Writer Oscar Dahl said that "the insubordination of Stanley was a necessary plot point to cover" because "without it, too much Stanley being Stanley becomes unbelievable". Furthermore, he wrote that there "was a lot of really funny stuff tonight" and highlighted "the scene between Darryl and Michael" due to Robinson's acting. Aubry D'Arminio from Entertainment Weekly stated that "Mike's embarrassment, and his unwillingness at first to admit he is disliked, was very very well played on Carell's part." Furthermore, D'Arminio praised several of the episode's lines of dialogue and wrote "I cannot even come near to picking a favorite quote [...] for this episode"

References

External links
 "Did I Stutter?" at NBC.com

The Office (American season 4) episodes
2008 American television episodes